Alice Tarbuck is an academic, writer and literature professional based in Edinburgh.

Tarbuck holds a BA and MPhil in English Literature from Emmanuel College, Cambridge, and a doctorate from the University of Dundee. Her thesis explored poetry and practice of Thomas A. Clark. She taught creative writing at the University of Dundee. She writes about her experiences as a modern witch  and practices what she describes  as 'intersectional, accessible' witchcraft.

Her best known work is A Spell in the Wild: A Year (and six centuries) of Magic.

Awards and honours
She won a Scottish Book Trust New Writer’s Award for poetry in 2019.

References 

Scottish non-fiction writers
Scottish women writers
People associated with the University of Dundee
Living people
Year of birth missing (living people)